Berwick Grammar School (BGS) is the senior boys campus of St Margaret's and Berwick Grammar School, located in Officer, Victoria, Australia. The St Margaret's senior girls campus and co-educational junior school are both located in Berwick. The head of campus is Steven Middleton, with the current school principal being Annette Rome. BGS has approximately 180 enrolled students and is part of the Victorian School of Performing Arts.

Berwick Grammar School was opened by then Governor of Victoria, David de Kretser, on 9 November 2009.

Between the years 2009 (the foundation year of the school) and 2014, the school progressively expanded from offering years 5 to 7, to eventually becoming a year 5 to 12 school. In 2016, it was announced that by 2018 the Year 5 and 6 classes would be relocated to the St Margaret's junior school campus in Berwick, to focus on co-educational opportunities within the junior school.

History
Berwick Grammar School was founded in 1882 as a school of approximately 400 students; contemporary commentators noted that the enrollment was below expectations, but spoke highly of those students who were enrolled. In World War I, nine students signed up as soldiers and were killed in action, which spurred the creation of a memorial on campus grounds in 1920.

Statistics
Berwick Grammar School, according to one source, is one of the highest-ranked schools in Melbourne's southeast, with an average study score of 31 out of 50 in 2020.

Houses 
There are three houses at BGS. These are Forsyth (yellow), Richards (red) and Battye (blue). Each year they compete in numerous inter-house competitions to win the annual house cup. These houses are named after prominent founding members of the school.

Sport 
Berwick Grammar is a member of the Southern Independent Schools (SIS).

SIS premierships 
Berwick Grammar has won the following SIS senior premierships.

 Basketball (4) - 2014, 2015, 2017, 2019
 Soccer - 2016

References

External links
Berwick Grammar School website

Private secondary schools in Melbourne
Boys' schools in Victoria (Australia)
Educational institutions established in 2009
Grammar schools in Australia
2009 establishments in Australia
Buildings and structures in the Shire of Cardinia